The Australian Archaeological Institute at Athens (AAIA) is one of the seventeen foreign archaeological institutes in Greece. Founded in 1980, it aims to promote Greek studies in Australia, as well as to enable Australian scholars to engage in archaeological fieldwork in Greece. The Institute has been involved in projects in excavations at Torone (Greek Macedonia), Zagora (Andros), and in the Paliochora survey (Kythira).

The Visiting Professorship 

Each year the Institute brings to Australia a distinguished academic who undertakes a lecture tour to all Institutional members across the country.

Hostel in Athens 

The Australian Archaeological Institute at Athens also runs a Hostel in Athens for visiting Academics and students

Bibliography
E. Korka et al. (eds.): Foreign Archaeological Schools in Greece, 160 Years, Athens, Hellenic Ministry of Culture, 2006, p. 30–37.

External links
 AAIA website
 AAIA at CCNESA

Foreign Archaeological Institutes in Greece
Organizations established in 1980